Budnick is an American film producer whose work includes serving as one of the executive producers of The Hangover (2009), the highest-grossing R-rated comedy of all time.

He is also noteworthy for his efforts as a volunteer  in California State prisons and advocacy on behalf of prisoners, and he was awarded the 2012 California Governor's Volunteer of the Year for his efforts. He founded the Anti-Recidivism Coalition.

Early life and education
Budnick grew up in Atlanta and graduated Woodward Academy in 1995. He attended Emory University graduating in 1999 with a Bachelor of Business Administration and a  B.A. in Film.

Filmography
The Hangover (2009) — executive producer
The Hangover Part II (2011) — producer
War Dogs (2016) - producer
Just Mercy (2019) — executive producer

References

External links

'Hangover' producer Scott Budnick lists Sherman Oaks farmhouse for $3.55 million

American film producers
Living people
Year of birth missing (living people)
Prison reformers
Woodward Academy alumni